This is a list of the 2021 Professional Darts Corporation calendar of events with player progression documented from the quarterfinals stage where applicable. 

The list includes European tour events, Players Championships events, World Series of Darts events and PDC majors. It includes some regional tours, such as the ones in North American, Asian and Oceanic regions, but does not include World Darts Federation (WDF) events.

January

February

March

April

May

June

July

August

September

October

November

December

See also
List of players with a 2021 PDC Tour Card
2021 PDC Pro Tour

References

External links
Professional Darts Corporation Ltd. – official website

Professional Darts Corporation
2021 in darts